Acanthonevra scutellopunctata is a species of fly described by German entomologist Erich Martin Hering in 1952.

References

Phytalmiinae